Bessaker is a coastal fishing village in the municipality of Åfjord in Trøndelag county, Norway. It is located north of the Brandsfjorden, about a  drive (to the southwest) to the village of Roan and about a  drive (to the northeast) to the village of Steinsdalen in neighboring Osen municipality. The village of Bessaker has about 200 inhabitants.

Bessaker has a good harbor and it was previously visited regularly by the Hurtigruten, but today the ships call there on special occasions only, such as the annual fisheries festival, the Fiskefestivalen.

References

External links
Official site
Fiskefestivalen

Åfjord
Villages in Trøndelag